The Azerbaijan national beach soccer team represents Azerbaijan in international beach soccer competitions and is controlled by the AFFA, the governing body for football in Azerbaijan. The current coach of the team is Zeynal Zeynalov. Farid Novruzi is the President of BSFF.

Tournament Records

Beach Soccer World Cup

FIFA Beach Soccer World Cup Qualification (UEFA)

Euro Beach Soccer Cup

Euro Beach Soccer League
Euro Beach Soccer League

Pro Beach Soccer Tour
Pro Beach Soccer Tour

Beach Soccer Intercontinental Cup

BSWW Mundialito

European Games

Current squad
Correct as of July 2012:

Coach: Bahram Hatamov

Achievements
 2008 Season
 Euro Beach Soccer Cup, Baku, Azerbaijan: 3rd Place
 2015 Season
European Games: 8th Place
 2018 Season
Euro Beach Soccer League: 8th Place

Notable players

References

External links
 BSWW Profile
 Profile on Beach Soccer Russia
 Azerbaijan Beach Soccer Federation

European national beach soccer teams
Football in Azerbaijan
Azerbaijan national football team
Beach soccer, national